Rosepine is a town in Vernon Parish, Louisiana, United States. The population was 1,692 at the 2010 census. It is part of the Fort Polk South Micropolitan Statistical Area.

History
In 1897 the Kansas City, Shreveport & Gulf Railway Company (KCS&G), owned by the Kansas City, Pittsburg and Gulf Railroad (KCP&G) was completed through Rosepine, Dequincy, and on to Port Arthur, Texas. By 1901 sawmills of Brice Brothers and Craft, Diamond Lumber Company Ltd, Lewis and Williams, and Rosepine Lumber Company were in operation. In 1900 the Kansas City Southern Railway took possession of the KCS&G. 

Rosepine was incorporated in 1902, with J.J. Cryer as mayor. and reincorporated in 1950. In 1900 the town had 75 residents but grew to more than 1,000 by 1906.

Geography
Rosepine is located at  (30.919620, -93.282869).

According to the United States Census Bureau, the town has a total area of 2.2 square miles (5.8 km), all land.
It is located sixteen miles southwest of Leesville.

Demographics

2020 census

As of the 2020 United States census, there were 1,519 people, 697 households, and 404 families residing in the town.

2000 census
As of the census of 2000, there were 1,390 people, 498 households, and 355 families residing in the town. The racial makeup of the town was 85.47% White, 5.83% African American, 1.08% Native American, 1.65% Asian, 2.95% from other races, and 3.02% from two or more races. Hispanic or Latino of any race were 5.97% of the population.

There were 498 households, out of which 38.8% had children under the age of 18 living with them, 53.4% were married couples living together, 14.9% had a female householder with no husband present, and 28.7% were non-families. 24.9% of all households were made up of individuals, and 9.0% had someone living alone who was 65 years of age or older. The average household size was 2.61 and the average family size was 3.13.

In the town, the population was spread out, with 27.6% under the age of 18, 11.4% from 18 to 24, 28.1% from 25 to 44, 18.0% from 45 to 64, and 15.0% who were 65 years of age or older. The median age was 34 years. For every 100 females, there were 93.9 males. For every 100 females age 18 and over, there were 91.1 males.

The median income for a household in the town was $30,063, and the median income for a family was $32,778. Males had a median income of $28,988 versus $23,958 for females. The per capita income for the town was $13,101. About 15.9% of families and 19.8% of the population were below the poverty line, including 22.3% of those under age 18 and 15.3% of those age 65 or over.

References

Towns in Louisiana
Towns in Vernon Parish, Louisiana